Vicente Mayagoitia was a Mexican gymnast. He competed in two events at the 1932 Summer Olympics.

References

Year of birth missing
Year of death missing
Mexican male artistic gymnasts
Olympic gymnasts of Mexico
Gymnasts at the 1932 Summer Olympics
Place of birth missing
20th-century Mexican people